Peckoltia brevis is a small species of Peckoltia belonging to the catfish family Loricariidae. Peckoltia brevis possesses the L-number L205.

Distribution
Peckoltia brevis is found in the middle and upper Amazon within the Purus river basin.

Appearance
Peckoltia brevis grows to around 11 cm and has numerous black spots and stripes on its yellow coloured body. Males can be distinguished from females by their slimmer profile and small teeth-like projections or odontodes across the back half of their body.

Habits
Peckoltia brevis inhabits tangled woody backwaters and feeds primarily on small meaty foods (such as carrion) and algae.

In the aquarium
Its behaviour is typical of other Loricariidae species; being very peaceful and sometimes inactive. The species is not exceptionally common in the aquarium trade.

References
Planet catfish - http://www.planetcatfish.com/common/species.php?species_id=1339
Fish Base - http://www.fishbase.org/summary/49958
 

Loricariidae
Fish described in 1935